Hanna's War is a 1988 film co-written and directed by Menahem Golan. The film is based on The Diaries of Hanna Senesh and the biographical novel A Great Wind Cometh by Yoel Palgi. It is a biopic detailing the true story of Hannah Szenes.

Plot
Hannah Senesh was a Hungarian schoolgirl with poetic aspirations. In the face of rising anti-Semitic tensions in Budapest, Hanna leaves her mother Katalin (Ellen Burstyn) and family behind to work on a kibbutz in then Palestine. There she is recruited by the British Air Force (RAF) for a dangerous mission: The RAF will train volunteers and parachute them over their native lands if they agree to help downed fliers escape from enemy territory. Realising it could be a suicide mission, Hanna accepts the assignment because she feels her family, still alive in Budapest, may soon be taken to the death camps by the Nazis. During her mission, Hanna is captured by the Nazis and ultimately undergoes a long, torturous interrogation process overseen by Captain Thomas Rosza. Her courage and indomitable will in the face of torture, fear and death will make her an inspiration to the allies and the world.

Principal cast

Production
The film was shot on location in Israel and Hungary. Early in development, Helena Bonham Carter was cast as Hanna with Peter Weir signing on as director. Due to delays in filming, Carter and Weir dropped out.

Critical Reception
The critical reception to the film was mixed. The Los Angeles Times gave the film a negative review, critiquing Ellen Burstyn's looks, rather than her performance. Another negative review came from Time Out who said "The bad script is based on a stale polemic, which produces an expensive and self-righteous piece of propaganda." Variety was more positive saying "Menahem Golan’s version, heroes and villains are easily distinguished, characters are respectfully observed and admired, or duly abhorred and discredited, and no time is spent dwelling on psychological niceties." Walter Goodman of The New York Times praised the supporting performances of Donald Pleasence and David Warner, but was critical of Anthony Andrews, "The villains provide what zest there is: Donald Pleasence, doing his nutty number as a sadist with a soft streak (I love a young girl's fingernails. Yours were so pretty.) and David Warner as the Uriah Heep of Hungarian Fascists (This will be the last time you will see one another - and I mean the last time). Anthony Andrews, playing a tough Scottish officer and gentleman, has the good luck to be eliminated fairly early.

DVD and VHS availability
Although the film has not been released on DVD, the VHS version is available for sale at sites such as Amazon.com.

References

External links

Film trailer for Hanna's War 

1988 films
American biographical films
American war films
Hungarian biographical films
American films based on actual events
Films based on biographies
Films directed by Menahem Golan
Films set in the 1940s
Films set in Hungary
Films shot in Hungary
Films shot in Israel
Golan-Globus films
Holocaust films
Hungarian-language films
Films about Jews and Judaism
Cultural depictions of David Ben-Gurion
Films with screenplays by Stanley Mann
American World War II films
Films produced by Menahem Golan
Films with screenplays by Menahem Golan
Films produced by Yoram Globus
1980s English-language films
1980s American films